Joseph Samuel Nye Jr. (born January 19, 1937) is an American political scientist. He and Robert Keohane co-founded the international relations theory of neoliberalism, which they developed in their 1977 book Power and Interdependence. Together with Keohane, he developed the concepts of asymmetrical and complex interdependence. They also explored transnational relations and world politics in an edited volume in the 1970s. More recently, he pioneered the theory of soft power and explained the distinction between it and hard power. His notion of "smart power" ("the ability to combine hard and soft power into a successful strategy") became popular with the use of this phrase by members of the Clinton Administration and the Obama Administration.

Nye is the former Dean of the John F. Kennedy School of Government at Harvard University, where he currently holds the position of University Distinguished Service Professor, Emeritus. In October 2014, Secretary of State John Kerry appointed Nye to the Foreign Affairs Policy Board. He is also a member of the Defense Policy Board. He has been a member of the Harvard faculty since 1964. He is a fellow of the American Academy of Arts & Sciences and a foreign fellow of The British Academy. He is also a member of the American Academy of Diplomacy.

The 2011 Teaching, Research, and International Policy (TRIP) survey of over 1,700 international relations scholars ranked Nye as the sixth most influential scholar in the field of international relations in the past 20 years. He was also ranked as one of the most influential figures in American foreign policy. In 2011, Foreign Policy magazine named him on its list of top global thinkers. In September 2014, Foreign Policy reported that international relations scholars and policymakers both ranked Nye as one of the field's most influential scholars.

Life and career

Education
Nye attended Morristown Prep (now the Morristown–Beard School) in Morristown, New Jersey and graduated in 1954. He then attended Princeton University, from where he graduated summa cum laude with a B.A. in history in 1958. He was a member of Phi Beta Kappa and won the Myron T. Herrick Thesis Prize. His senior thesis was titled "Death of a Family Firm: An Entrepreneurial History of the American Preserve Company." During his time at Princeton, Nye was vice president of the Colonial Club, a columnist for The Daily Princetonian, and a member of the American Whig–Cliosophic Society's Debate Panel. After studying Philosophy, Politics and Economics (PPE) as a Rhodes Scholar at Oxford University's Exeter College, he obtained his PhD in political science from Harvard University in 1964. Nye's doctoral dissertation was on regional integration in East Africa.

Career
Nye joined the Harvard faculty in 1964 and served as Director of the Center for Science and International Affairs at John F. Kennedy School of Government from 1985 to 1990 and as Associate Dean for International Affairs at Harvard University from 1989 to 1992. Nye also served as Director of the Center for International Affairs at Harvard University from 1989 to 1993 and Dean of John F. Kennedy School of Government from 1995 to 2004. Nye is currently (as of July 2018) University Distinguished Service Professor, Emeritus.

Nye and his colleague Keohane have been characterized as key figures in the development of a discipline of international political economy, largely as a result of their authorship of Power and Interdependence. Nye's influences include Karl Deutsch and Ernst Hass.

From 1977 to 1979, Nye was Deputy to the Undersecretary of State for Security Assistance, Science, and Technology and chaired the National Security Council Group on Nonproliferation of Nuclear Weapons. In recognition of his service, he was awarded the State Department's Distinguished Honor Award in 1979. In 1993 and 1994, he was Chairman of the National Intelligence Council, which coordinates intelligence estimates for the President, and was awarded the Intelligence Community's Distinguished Service Medal. In the Clinton Administration from 1994 to 1995, Nye served as Assistant Secretary of Defense for International Security Affairs, and was awarded the Department's Distinguished Service Medal with Oak Leaf Cluster. Nye was considered by many to be the preferred choice for National Security Advisor in the 2004 presidential campaign of John Kerry.

He is the chairman of the North American branch of the Trilateral Commission and the co-chair of the Aspen Strategy Group. He is also a member of the Atlantic Council's Board of Directors. Nye has also served as a trustee of Radcliffe College and Wells College. He was on the board of directors of the Council on Foreign Relations, the Guiding Coalition of the Project on National Security Reform, the Advisory Board of Carolina for Kibera, and the Board of the Center for Strategic and International Studies. He has been awarded the Woodrow Wilson Prize by Princeton University and the Charles E. Merriman Prize by the American Political Science Association. In 2005, he was awarded the Honorary Patronage of the University Philosophical Society of Trinity College Dublin and has been awarded honorary degrees by ten colleges and universities. In 2010, Nye won the Foreign Policy Distinguished Scholar Award from the International Studies Association. In 2009, he was made a Theodore Roosevelt Fellow of the American Academy of Political and Social Science.

In October 2014, Secretary of State John Kerry appointed Nye to the Foreign Affairs Policy Board. The group meets periodically to discuss strategic questions and to provide the Secretary and other senior Department officials with independent informed perspectives and ideas. In November 2014, Nye was awarded the Order of the Rising Sun, Gold and Silver Star in recognition of his "contribution to the development of studies on Japan-U.S. security and to the promotion of the mutual understanding between Japan and the United States."

Nye serves as a Commissioner for the Global Commission on Internet Governance, and served on the Global Commission on the Stability of Cyberspace from 2017 until its conclusion in 2019.

Nye coined the term soft power in the late 1980s, and it first came into widespread usage following a piece he wrote in Foreign Policy in 1990. Nye has consistently written for Project Syndicate since 2002.

Personal life
Nye and his wife, Molly Harding Nye, have three adult sons. He is a member of a Unitarian Universalist Association church.

Bibliography
 Pan Africanism and East African integration (Harvard University Press, 1965)
 Peace in Parts: Integration and Conflict in Regional Organization (Little Brown and Company, 1971)
 Transnational Relations and World Politics, co-authored with Robert O. Keohane (Harvard University Press, 1972)
 Power and Interdependence: World Politics in Transition, co-authored with Keohane (Little Brown and Company, 1977; Longman, 2000)
 Living with Nuclear Weapons. A Report by the Harvard Nuclear Study Group (Harvard University Press, 1983)
 Hawks, Doves and Owls: An Agenda for Avoiding Nuclear War, co-authored with Graham Allison and Albert Carnesale (Norton, 1985)
 Nuclear Ethics (The Free Press, 1986)
 Bound to Lead: The Changing Nature of American Power (Basic Books, 1990)
 Understanding International Conflicts: An Introduction to Theory and History, 7th ed. (Longman, 2008)
 The Paradox of American Power: Why the World’s Only Superpower Can’t Go it Alone (Oxford University Press, 2002)
 Power in the Global Information Age: From Realism to Globalization (Routledge, 2004)
 Soft Power: The Means to Success in World Politics (PublicAffairs, 2004)
 "Soft Power and American Foreign Policy." Political Science Quarterly 119.2 (2004): 255-70.
 The Power Game: A Washington Novel (PublicAffairs, 2004)
 The Powers to Lead (Oxford University Press, 2008)
 The Future of Power (PublicAffairs, 2011)
 Presidential Leadership and the Creation of the American Era (Princeton University Press, 2013)
 Is the American Century Over? (Polity, 2015) 
 Do Morals Matter? Presidents and Foreign Policy from FDR to Trump (Oxford University Press, 2020);

Essays and reporting

See also
 Globalism

References

External links

|-

1937 births
Alumni of Exeter College, Oxford
American political scientists
American Rhodes Scholars
Atlantic Council 
Center for a New American Security
Corresponding Fellows of the British Academy
Commissioners of the Global Commission on the Stability of Cyberspace
Harvard University alumni
American international relations scholars
Harvard Kennedy School deans
Harvard Kennedy School faculty
Living people 
Morristown-Beard School alumni
National Bureau of Asian Research
Recipients of the Ordre des Palmes Académiques
People from Morristown, New Jersey
Political liberals (international relations)
Princeton University alumni
Recipients of the Order of the Rising Sun, 2nd class
United States Assistant Secretaries of Defense